George Chapman (28 February 1909 – 13 October 2003) was an  Australian rules footballer who played with Fitzroy and St Kilda in the Victorian Football League (VFL).

Notes

External links 
		

1909 births
2003 deaths
Australian rules footballers from Victoria (Australia)
Fitzroy Football Club players
St Kilda Football Club players
Oakleigh Football Club players